Die Nonnen (The Nuns), Op. 112, is composition for mixed choir and orchestra by Max Reger, written in 1909. The text is a poem by Martin Boelitz.

History 
Reger completed Die Nonnen in 1909. It was first published by Bote & Bock in Berlin in 1910, with a dedication to Philipp Wolfrum. It was published again in 1967 as part of Reger's complete works by Breitkopf & Härtel.

Recording 
Die Nonnen was recorded in 2000, together with Reger's Romantische Suite, by the NDR Chor and the Saarbrücken Radio Symphony Orchestra conducted by Hans Zender.

References

Cited sources

External links 
 
 Die Nonnen (in German) lieder.net 2021

Choral compositions
Compositions by Max Reger